Camille Dalmais (born 10 March 1978), better known by her mononym Camille, is a French singer and occasional actress.

Biography

Early life 
Camille was born and raised in Paris. Her mother was an English-language teacher and her father, Hervé Dalmais was a musician. As a teenager, she studied ballet and developed an interest in bossa nova music and American stage musicals. She attended the prestigious Lycée International de Saint Germain-en-Laye, where she obtained her baccalaureate in literature. Thanks to her mother being an English teacher, Camille speaks English fluently as well as her native French. She performed her first original song "Un Homme Déserté" at the age of sixteen while attending a wedding. In the early 2000s, while performing at jazz clubs in Paris, Camille made her acting debut in the film  (by Antoine de Caunes; with Asia Argento and Guillaume Canet). She also contributed to the song "La Vie la Nuit" in its soundtrack.

She attended Sciences Po Paris just before beginning her music career.

Music career 
In early 2002, Camille signed a recording contract with Virgin Records. She released her first studio album Le Sac des Filles. In 2004, she began working with Marc Collin and his band Nouvelle Vague, which incorporates new wave and bossa nova music. She contributed vocals to the songs "Too Drunk to Fuck", "In a Manner of Speaking", "The Guns of Brixton", and "Making Plans for Nigel" on their first album.

In 2005, she released the album Le Fil, which was produced in collaboration with English producer MaJiKer. This album incorporated an avant-garde concept – a string, or thread ("le fil"), which was a drone that persisted throughout the entire course of the album. All of the songs on this album are based on the exploration of the voice, with only a double bass, bass guitar, guitar, trombone, percussion, or keyboard as accompanying instruments. Le Fil quickly became certified gold. The song "Ta Douleur" was voted 26th in Australia's Triple J Hottest 100, 2006.

In June 2007, Camille performed Benjamin Britten's A Ceremony of Carols and a new a cappella work God is sound (The 12 World Prayers) at L'église Saint-Eustache, Paris.

Camille's song "1, 2, 3" from Le Sac des Filles was used in the television ad for Cacharel's Promesse perfume starring Laetitia Casta and Matthew Avedon. Her song "Waves" was used in Perrier's "Melting" television ad.

Also in 2007, she contributed to the soundtrack of Pixar's Ratatouille, with the song entitled "Le Festin". Additionally, she provides the European French dub voice of Colette in Ratatouille.

Camille's album Music Hole was released on 7 April 2008, again produced in collaboration with MaJiKer. Music Hole was recorded and mixed by Valgeir Sigurdsson. The first single from the album, "Gospel with No Lord", was released for online download on 11 February 2008, along with another new song from the album entitled "Money Note".

Her song, "Ta douleur" was featured on the American television program Saturday Night Live. The original sketch aired in October 2010 titled "Les jeunes de Paris" hosted by actress Emma Stone.

She contributed to the track "Putain putain" on Nouvelle Vague's 2010 album Couleurs sur Paris for whom she had previously done work for on their first album. She later appeared on Jérôme Van Den Hole's self-titled album on the track, "Debout".

Her song "Pour que l'amour me quitte", from her 2005 album Le Fil, was covered in Italian superstar Elisa's 2010 acoustic album Ivy in collaboration with her colleague Giorgia.

She is featured in the soundtrack with Hans Zimmer and Richard Harvey to the 2015 French animated film The Little Prince.

Her song "She was" was a theme in the 2022 movie Corsage about the Empress Elisabeth of Austria.

Personal life 
She has two children with musician and percussionist Clément Ducol – Marius, born 18 November 2010, and Lila, born in August 2013. She is an atheist.

Discography

Studio albums

Guest appearances

Filmography 
 2001: Love Bites
 2007: Ratatouille (French voice – singer)
 2009: Bulles de Vian (Telefilm)
 2013: On My Way
 2014: Fever
 2015: The Little Prince

Awards 
 2005: Prix Constantin for Le Fil
 2006: Group or artist stage révélation of the year for Le Fil at the Victoires de la musique
 2006: Album révélation of the year for Le Fil at the Victoires de la musique
 2006: Best Female Singer at the Globes de Cristal Award
 2007: oui-oui tente de voler/a4wm2007/2007_camille.shtml (BBC Radio 3 Award for World Music (Winner, Europe))
 2009: Victoires de la Musique for Female group or artist of the year
 2013: Victoires de la musique for song of year of "Allez Allez Allez"
 2018: Victoires de la musique for Tour of Year

References

External links 

 Official website  
 
 Le sac des fans

1978 births
Living people
French atheists
Annie Award winners
Lycée Henri-IV alumni
Sciences Po alumni
English-language singers from France
Singers from Paris
21st-century French singers
21st-century French women singers
Because Music artists
Virgin Records artists